José Manuel Mendonca Sena (born 13 July 1955) is a Portuguese middle-distance runner. He competed in the men's 3000 metres steeplechase at the 1980 Summer Olympics.

References

External links
 

1955 births
Living people
Athletes (track and field) at the 1980 Summer Olympics
Portuguese male middle-distance runners
Portuguese male steeplechase runners
Olympic athletes of Portugal
Place of birth missing (living people)